Bonne Pomme  is a 2017 French comedy film directed by Florence Quentin, written by Florence Quentin and Alexis Quentin, and starring Gérard Depardieu and Catherine Deneuve.

Plot 
Gerard is tired of being taken for naive by his in-laws. He leaves everything and opens a garage in a village nestled at the bottom of the Gâtinais. In front of the garage, there is a lovely inn, run by Barbara, a beautiful, disconcerting, mysterious, unpredictable woman.

Cast 
 Gérard Depardieu as Gérard Morlet
 Catherine Deneuve as Barbara
 Guillaume de Tonquédec as The mayor
 Chantal Ladesou as Mémé Morillon
 Grégoire Ludig as Rico
 Gauthier Battoue as Manu
 Françoise Lépine as Nadine
 Blandine Bellavoir as Marylou
 Benjamin Voisin as Thomas
 Céline Jorrion as Arlette
 Anaël Snoek as Martine
 Nathalie Vignes as Madame Mangin
 Ben Manz as Anglais 1
 Tom Sharp as Anglais 2

References

External links 

2017 films
2017 comedy films
French comedy films
2010s French-language films
2010s French films